Ronnie Johnson (born c. 1947) was a Canadian football player who played for the Winnipeg Blue Bombers. He played college football at Oklahoma State University–Stillwater.

References

1940s births
American football quarterbacks
Canadian football quarterbacks
American players of Canadian football
Oklahoma State Cowboys football players
Winnipeg Blue Bombers players
Living people